St Patrick's Cathedral, Armagh is a Church of Ireland cathedral in Armagh, Northern Ireland. It is the seat of the Anglican Archbishop of Armagh and Diocese of Armagh. It was originally the site of a Celtic Christian monastery, said to have been founded by St Patrick. Throughout the Middle Ages, the cathedral was the seat of the Catholic Archbishop of Armagh, head of the Catholic Church in Ireland, and one of the most important churches in Gaelic Ireland. With the 16th-century Protestant Reformation, the cathedral was taken over by the Church of Ireland, with Englishman, George Cromer, becoming the first Anglican archbishop. 

Following Catholic Emancipation in the 19th century, a new Catholic cathedral was built in Armagh, also called St Patrick's Cathedral.

History

Early history of the site
The cathedral was historically the ecclesiastical capital of the Roman Catholic Church in Ireland. According to tradition, a church was founded on the site in 445 by Saint Patrick. Evidence suggests that the hilltop was originally a pagan sanctuary. 

By the 7th century, it had become the most important monastery and monastic school in the north of Ireland, and monastic settlement grew up around it.

Brian Boru, High King of Ireland, visited Armagh in 1004, acknowledging it as the head cathedral of Ireland and bestowing it a large sum of gold. Brian was buried at Armagh cathedral after his death at the Battle of Clontarf in 1014. Armagh's claim to the primacy of Ireland was formally acknowledged at the Synod of Ráth Breasail in 1111.

The church itself was partially destroyed and rebuilt 17 times. It was renovated and restored under Dean Eoghan McCawell (1505–1549), having suffered from a devastating fire in 1511 and being in poor shape. Soon after his death the cathedral was described by Lord Chancellor Cusack as "one of the fairest and best churches in Ireland". However, by the end of the Nine Years' War in 1603, Armagh lay in ruins.

The cathedral and its assets were appropriated by the new state church, called the Church of Ireland, as part of the Protestant Reformation. The English government under King Henry VIII of England transferred the assets. It has remained in Anglican hands since the reign of Queen Elizabeth I of England.

Modern history
Following the Nine Years' War, Armagh came under English control and the town began to be settled by Protestants from Britain, as part of the Plantation of Ulster. During the Irish Rebellion of 1641, many Protestant settlers fled to Armagh cathedral for safety. After negotiations with the besieged settlers, Catholic rebels occupied the town until May 1642.

The cathedral was substantially rebuilt between 1834 and 1840 by Archbishop Lord John George Beresford and the architect Lewis Nockalls Cottingham. The fabric remains that of the mediaeval building but much restored. While Cottingham was heavy-handed in his restoration, the researches of T. G. F. Patterson and Janet Myles in the late twentieth century have shown the restoration to have been notably antiquarian for its time. The tracery of the nave windows in particular are careful restorations as is the copy of the font. The capital decoration of the two westernmost pillars of the nave (either side of the West Door internal porch) are mediaeval as are the bulk of the external gargoyle carvings (some resited) of the parapet of the Eastern Arm. Cottingham's intention of retaining the richly cusped West Door with flanking canopied niches was over-ruled. Subsequent restorations have more radically altered the internal proportions of the mediaeval building, proportions which Cottingham had retained.

Many other Celtic and mediaeval carvings are to be seen within the cathedral which is also rich in eighteenth- and nineteenth-century sculpture. There are works by Francis Leggatt Chantrey, Louis-François Roubiliac, John Michael Rysbrack, Carlo Marochetti and others.

The Choral Foundation, dating from the Culdees, and refounded as the Royal College of King Charles of Vicars Choral and Organist in the cathedral of Armagh, continues to the present. There are generally a dozen Gentlemen of the Lay Vicars Choral and sixteen boy choristers.

The Maundy Money was distributed at the cathedral in 2008: a plaque in the south aisle commemorates this event.

Notable burials
Brian Boru (c.942–1014), High King of Ireland
Saint Ethnea, baptised by St Patrick, died around 433 A.D.; her Feast Day is 11 January
Marcus Gervais Beresford (1801–85), Archbishop of Armagh and Primate of All Ireland (appointed 1862). Cousin of Lord John Beresford
Charles Frederick D'Arcy (1859–1938), Archbishop of Armagh and Primate of All Ireland
Lord John Beresford
John Baptist Crozier and his wife Alice Isabella

Organists

 1634 Richard Galway
 1661 John Hawkshaw
 1695 Robert Hodge
 1711 William Toole
 1722 Samuel Bettridge
 1752 John Woffington
 1759 Robert Barnes
 1776 Langrishe Doyle
 1782 Richard Langdon
 1794 John Clarke Whitfield
 1797 John Jones
 1816 Frederick Horncastle
 1823 Robert Turle
 1872 Thomas Marks
 1917 G. H. P. Hewson
 1920 Edred Chaundy
 1935 Reginald West
 1951 Frederick Carter
 1966 Christopher Phelps
 1968 Martin White
 2002–2015 Theo Saunders
 2015–present Stephen Timpany

See also

Dean of Armagh, a list of deans
List of cathedrals in Ireland
St Patrick's Cathedral, Armagh (Roman Catholic)

References

External links

 Official website
 Details of the organ from the National Pipe Organ Register

Diocese of Armagh (Church of Ireland)
Churches in County Armagh
Buildings and structures in Armagh (city)
Armagh
Grade A listed buildings
Culdees
Pre-Reformation Roman Catholic cathedrals
Burial sites of the O'Brien dynasty